Gianni Ianuale (28 March 1946) is an Italian poet, literary critic lives and works in Napoli.

Life and career

Born in Castello di Cisterna nearby Napoli, Italian poet and literary critic active in both activities with the organization of prizes and poetic presentations. Gianni Ianuale was a pupil of the Jesuit Angelo Arpa spiritual adviser of Federico Fellini. He is also the author of song lyrics. 
In 2002 Gianni Ianuale established the Academy Internazionale Vesuviana. 
In 2009 he organized the Premio Lettere ed arti “Due Sicilie” in Palermo.
The poet  is a member of leading Italian literary awards as: Premio Juan Montalvo, Premio Letterario Castrum Cisternae

Published works

Bibliography

References

External links
 Ianuale Gianni - Biografie scrittori, poeti, artisti - Wuz.it
 Gianni Ianuale: Libri dell'autore in vendita online
 La forza della fede nella poesia
 Giovane poeta premiato a "Casal di Principe"

1946 births
Italian male poets
20th-century Italian poets
Living people
20th-century Italian male writers